This is a list of the published novels set in the fantasy world of Dark Sun, which was originally a campaign setting for the role-playing game Dungeons & Dragons. Please refer to the main  Dark Sun article for further information.

 Prism Pentad – Troy Denning
 The Verdant Passage (October 1991),
 The Crimson Legion (April 1992),
 The Amber Enchantress (October 1992),
 The Obsidian Oracle (June 1993),
 The Cerulean Storm (September 1993),
 Tribe of One – Simon Hawke
 The Outcast (November 1993),
 The Seeker (April 1994), 
 The Nomad (October 1994),
 Chronicles of Athas – Various Authors
 The Brazen Gambit (July 1994), by Lynn Abbey
 The Darkness Before the Dawn (February 1995), by Ryan Hughes
 The Broken Blade (May 1995), by Simon Hawke
 Cinnabar Shadows (July 1995), by Lynn Abbey
 The Rise & Fall of a Dragon King (April 1996), by Lynn Abbey
 New Fiction (2010/11) – Various Authors
 City Under the Sand (October 2010), by Jeff Mariotte
 Under the Crimson Sun (June 2011), by Keith R.A. DeCandido
 Death Mark (December 2011), by Robert J. Schwalb

Dark Sun novels
Fantasy novel series
Lists of fantasy books
Dark Sun